Adrian Buoncristiani (born c. 1940) is a former college basketball coach.  He served as the head coach for six seasons at Gonzaga University in Spokane, Washington, from 1972 to 1978.

Early years
Buoncristiani grew up in San Francisco, California, and attended high school at St. Ignatius in the city.

Buoncristiani started his coaching career at the high school level in California at Mission in San Luis Obispo for two years and then at Righetti in Santa Maria. He became a college assistant in 1970 at U.C. Santa Barbara, where he stayed for two seasons.

Gonzaga
Hired in April 1972, Buoncristiani succeeded Hank Anderson, who left Gonzaga after 21 years as head coach for a similar position at Montana State in Bozeman, then a conference rival in the Big Sky Conference. Less than a week after accepting the job, Buoncristiani was involved in a traffic accident in Spokane in which his car was demolished, but "ABC"  escaped with only minor injuries.

In his six seasons at Gonzaga, Buoncristiani had an overall record of 78–82, and a conference record of 39–45, but never finished better than third in the Big Sky.

Weeks after the conclusion of the 1978 season, Buoncristiani was encouraged to resign in April, days before letter of intent signing day.  He was succeeded by Dan Fitzgerald, a former GU assistant during ABC's first two years with the Bulldogs and a teammate from high school at St. Ignatius in San Francisco.

Fitzgerald immediately pushed for a change in conferences, first as head coach and soon added title of athletic director. Gonzaga left the Big Sky in June 1979 and joined the West Coast Athletic Conference, swapping places with Nevada.

After coaching
Buoncristiani moved to Kansas City in 1978 to work for Converse athletic shoes; he was the "Salesman of the Year" in his first year. After three years, he relocated with Converse to Reno, Nevada, and later lived in Spokane.

Buoncristiani returned to Nevada and was an assistant coach at Galena High School in Reno. His son Lance was 1999 graduate of Galena and was a point guard at Idaho for his freshman season in 2000.

Head coaching record

References

External links
Sports Reference – coaching record – Adrian Buoncristiani
Gonzaga University Digital Collections – Adrian Buoncristiani

1940 births
Living people
American men's basketball coaches
American men's basketball players
Basketball coaches from California
Basketball players from San Francisco
California Polytechnic State University alumni
College men's basketball head coaches in the United States
Gonzaga Bulldogs men's basketball coaches
Guards (basketball)
Santa Clara Broncos men's basketball players
UC Santa Barbara Gauchos men's basketball coaches